Al-Taghreba al-Falastenya is a 2004 Syrian Historical drama TV series, considered one of the most important works of drama about the Palestinian cause, produced by "Syrian Art Production International" company. The series was shot entirely in Syria. The series is a dramatic epic that revolves around the suffering of a poor Palestinian family during the time of the British occupation on Palestine, then the massacres by the Zionist militias between the 1930s and 1960s.

Plot

Cast

Jamal Suliman
Khaled Taja
Rami Hanna
Nadine Salameh
Juliet Awwad
 Taim Hasan
Nesreen Tafesh
 Maxim Khalil
 Anahid Fayad

Production

Awards 
 Khaled Taja won the Best Actor Award for a Second Role for his performance in Al-Taghreba al-Falastenya, at the Cairo Festival for Radio and Television, 2005.

References

External links

 Al-Taghreba al-Falastenya on Elcinema.
 The series on YouTube
 Al-Taghrebah-Al-Felastenyah on Shahid net

Syrian drama television series
2000s Syrian television series
Television series set in the 1930s
Television series set in the 1940s
Television series set in the 1950s
Television series set in the 1960s
2004 Syrian television series debuts
Television shows set in Palestine
Arabic-language television shows
Arabic television series
2004 television series endings
Palestinian television series
Television shows filmed in Syria
Cultural depictions of Palestinian people
War television series
Television series about missing people
Television series about children
Television series about orphans
Television series about colonialism
Television series about countries
Television series about widowhood
Television series about Palestine
Television series by Syrian Art Production International
Political drama television series
Syrian mystery television series
Syrian historical television series
Television series about families
Television series about couples
Television shows about death
Television series about revenge
Drama television series about the Israeli–Palestinian conflict